American Romance is a 2016 American thriller film directed by Zackary Adler and starring Daveigh Chase and Nolan Gerard Funk.

Plot

Cast
Daveigh Chase as Krissy Madison
Nolan Gerard Funk as Jeff Madison
John Savage as Emery Reed
Meiling Melançon as Denice Torres
James Duval as Stewart Miles
Diane Farr as Brenda Reed
Mark Boone Junior as Hank
Barlow Jacobs as Ricky Stern
Sofia Mali as Young Krissy

Reception
Dann Gire of the Daily Herald gave the film a negative review, describing it as "dull and just plain icky."

References

External links
 
 

2016 films
American thriller films
2016 thriller films
2010s English-language films
Films directed by Zackary Adler
2010s American films